The Women's EuroHockey Championship III, formerly known as the Women's EuroHockey Nations Challenge I,  is a competition for European national field hockey teams. It is the third level of European field hockey Championships for national teams.

This is the lowest tier and there is promotion to the second tier. The two first ranked teams qualify for the next Women's EuroHockey Championship II and are replaced by the two lowest-ranked teams from that tournament.

The tournament has been won by eight different teams: Wales has the most titles with two and the Czech Republic, France, Lithuania, Russia, Switzerland, Turkey and Ukraine have all won the tournament once. The most recent edition was held in Lipovci, Slovenia and was won by Ukraine.

Results

Summary

* = host nation

Team appearances

See also
 Men's EuroHockey Championship III
 Women's EuroHockey Championship II

References

External links
European Hockey Federation

 
Women's international field hockey competitions in Europe
Recurring sporting events established in 2005